Ugly Gerry is a font whose characters consist of shapes of United States congressional districts, its intention being to protest gerrymandering. It was created by Ben Doessel and James Lee through the Leo Burnett Agency for RepresentUs.

Design

The designers' intention was to draw attention to gerrymandering:

The team is from Chicago, and after seeing how janky our Illinois 4th district had become, we became interested in this issue. . . . Its notorious earmuff shape looked like a U, then after seeing other letters on the map, the idea hit us, let’s create a typeface so our districts can become digital graffiti that voters and politicians can’t ignore.

Shapes that loosely resemble the letters 'A' through 'Z' were used to create the (uppercase) font. Some of these shapes are not of single districts but instead combine pairs.

Ugly Gerry has been called "the world's most revolting font".

Usability 
The Ugly Gerry font has no numerals, punctuation or other special characters. It provides only the capital letters 'A' to 'Z' (no lowercase). At the foot of each page of its website is "No rights reserved".

Recognition
Ugly Gerry won the 2020 ADC Award for typography.

References

External links 

Casual script typefaces
Gerrymandering in the United States
Political art
Public domain typefaces
Typefaces and fonts introduced in 2019